Svojkovice is a municipality and village in Rokycany District in the Plzeň Region of the Czech Republic. It has about 400 inhabitants.

Geography
The western part of the municipality is located in the Švihov Highlands, the eastern parts extends into the Křivoklát Highlands. The Holoubkovský Stream flows through the municipality.

History
The first written mention of Svojkovice is from 1379 under the name Svejkovice. It was then owned by the Rosenberg family as a part of the Strašice estate. The settlement was located a trade route leading from Prague to Rokycany. In 1422, it was sold to Zdeněk of Rožmitál and joined to the Zbiroh estate. Since then Svejkovice has shared the owners and destinies with this estate.

The Thirty Years' War left Svejkovice completely abandoned. It was not until 1712 that resettlement of the village was documented. In 1860, the railway near the village was built, but the local railway station was not built until 1923. In 1886, a school was opened and Svejkovice became an independent municipality. In 1901, the village was severely damaged by fire. In 1924, the name of the village was officially changed to Svojkovice.

In May 1945, Svojkovice was liberated by the Soviet army. In 1959 a public swimming pool opened. In 1960 Svojkovice with Hůrky were incorporated into the municipality of Volduchy; in 1970, however, Svojkovice separated. From 1980 to 1990, Svojkovice was an administrative part of Rokycany. Since 1990, it has been a separate municipality.

Demographics

Transport
Svojkovice is located on the Plzeň–Beroun railway line. The municipality is located next to the D5 motorway leading from Prague to Plzeň, the old Prague–Plzeň road runs through the village.

References

External links

Populated places in Rokycany District